St. Patrick's Church Complex is a historic Roman Catholic church complex located in the Far Westside neighborhood of Syracuse, Onondaga County, New York. The complex consists of the church (1871-1872), rectory (1890), school and convent (1909), additions (1930), and shrine in the meditation garden (1959).  The church is a one-story, Gothic Revival style brick building measuring 60 feet wide and 128 feet long.  It has a basilica plan and features towers of uneven height and weight flanking a central front gable.

It was listed on the National Register of Historic Places in 2012.

History
St. Patrick's Church was founded in 1870 and is located in historic Tipperary Hill on the west side of Syracuse. The church was dedicated on September 15, 1872 by Bishop Francis McNerny of the Albany Diocese.

Many of the first parishioners arrived in 1825 from all the various counties in Ireland to work on the Erie Canal and settled in Tipperary Hill. The first mass was celebrated on July 31, 1870 by Rev. Hugh Shields, the first pastor, in Cool's Hall, located at 101 Hamilton Street, on the banks of the Erie Canal.  There is an annual Irish Festival.

Today
During the summer of 2012, St. Patrick's was canonically linked with St. Brigid's church, which means that they are still separate parishes, but share a pastor.

References 

Churches on the National Register of Historic Places in New York (state)
Gothic Revival church buildings in New York (state)
Roman Catholic churches completed in 1872
Roman Catholic churches in Syracuse, New York
National Register of Historic Places in Syracuse, New York
1870 establishments in New York (state)
Religious organizations established in 1870
19th-century Roman Catholic church buildings in the United States